Banjo & Sullivan: The Ultimate Collection is an album by Jesse Dayton and Lew Temple, recording as the fictional characters Banjo and Sullivan from Rob Zombie's 2005 American horror film The Devil's Rejects.

The album was conceived as a spin-off project inspired by on-set conversations between filmmaker Zombie and actor Lew Temple, who portrayed 'Adam Banjo' in the film. Soon after, Temple's long-time friend, Jesse Dayton (an Austin, Texas-based alt-country musician and songwriter) was approached to helm the project as producer and bandleader with Temple and Dayton sharing songwriting credit.
The album is presented as a greatest hits compilation from the 1970s, contemporary with the film's setting.

Track listing 
 "Dick Soup" - 2:27
 "I Don't Give a Truck" – 2:45
 "Honeymoon Song" – 3:26
 "I'm at Home Getting Hammered (While She's Out Getting Nailed)" – 2:43
 "Killer on the Lamb" – 3:54
 "I'm Trying to Quit, But I Just Quit Trying" – 2:56
 "She Didn't Like Me (But She Loved My Money)" – 3:19
 "Roy's Ramble" – 2:29
 "Lord, Don't Let Me Die in a Cheap Motel" – 3:08
 "Free Bird" – 5:17

Personnel
Steve Chadie - Engineer, Mixing 
Jesse Dayton - Guitar (Acoustic), Bass, Guitar, Vocals, Percussion, Producer, Mixing 
Sara Hamilton - Background Vocals 
Gavin Lurssen - Mastering 
Riley Osbourne - Piano, Organ (Hammond), Fender Rhodes, String Arrangements 
Gene Page - Photography 
Renato Queden - Illustrations 
Dana Smart - Supervisor 
Elmo Sproat - Bass (Upright) 
Adam Starr - Product Manager 
Beth Stempel - Production Coordination
Lew Temple - Lyrics (with Jesse Dayton) 
Brian Thomas - Banjo, Dobro, Pedal Steel 
Eric Tucker - Drums 
Jodie Wilson - Project Coordinator 
Rob Zombie - Executive Producer, Art Direction, Art Design

References 

Albums produced by Rob Zombie
2005 albums
Firefly (film series)
Country albums by American artists